In German folklore, a nachzehrer (also spelt nachtzehrer) is a sort of vampire. The word nachzehrer translates to "after (nach) living off (zehren)" likely alluding to their living after death or living off humans after death in addition to the choice of "nach" for "after" which is similar to "nacht" ("night"). The nachzehrer was prominent in the folklore of the northern regions of Germany, but even in Silesia and Bavaria, and the word was also used to describe a similar creature of the Kashubes of Northern Poland.

Overview
A Nachzehrer is created most commonly after suicide, and sometimes from an accidental death. According to German lore, a person does not become a nachzehrer from being bitten or scratched; the transformation happens after death and is not communicable. Nachzehrers are also related to sickness and disease. If a large group of people died of the plague, the first person to have died is believed to be a nachzehrer.

Typically, a nachzehrer devours its family members upon waking. It has also been said that they devour their own bodies, including their funeral shrouds, and the more of themselves they eat, the more of their family they physically drain. It is not unlikely that the idea of the dead eating themselves might have risen from bodies in open graves who had been partly eaten by scavengers like rats. 

The nachzehrer was similar to the Slavic vampire in that it was known to be a recently deceased person who returned from the grave to attack family and village acquaintances. 

It usually originated from an unusual death such as a person who died by suicide or accident. They were also associated with epidemic sickness, such as whenever a group of people died from the same disease, the person who died first was labeled to be the cause of the group's death. Another belief was that if a person's name was not removed from his burial clothing, that person would be a candidate for becoming a nachzehrer.

Such a belief was found even in the Republic of Venice, where the body of a woman, with a brick in her mouth, was discovered in 2006 in a mass grave of plague-dead people.
The official killing myth says a nachzehrer can be killed by placing a coin in its mouth, and then chopping off its head. It can be discerned from this that a mere coin in the mouth may result in paralysis as some myths say that a stake through a vampire's heart does. 

Finding nachzehrer in order to kill them is not difficult; it is characteristic of a nachzehrer to lie in its grave with its thumb in its opposite hand, and its left eye open. Additionally, they are easily found while eating their burial shroud due to the noise they produce doing so.

See also
Draugr (Norse mythology and Scandinavian folklore)
Revenant (English folklore)

References

Corporeal undead
German legendary creatures
Mythological hematophages
Shapeshifting
Vampires